Knut Boye (12 January 1937 – 21 July 2008) was a Norwegian academic, within the field of business administration.

He was born in Arendal. He graduated with the siv.øk. degree from the Norwegian School of Economics in 1963, and after becoming a certified mercantile teacher there in 1966, he spent the better part of his career there, lastly as an associate professor. Boye was first and foremost known as a lecturer and writer of textbooks in several fields of economics: finance, investment, acquisitions, business administration and personal economy. He penned 25 books, many of which were reissued, and edited the periodical Praktisk økonomi og finans from 1986. He died from cancer.

References

1937 births
2008 deaths
People from Arendal
Norwegian economists
Norwegian School of Economics alumni
Academic staff of the Norwegian School of Economics
Deaths from cancer in Norway